Simon Kane is a British writer, actor, and associate artist with the Shunt cooperative working in radio, television and theatre. He is the son of actor and writer John Kane and opera singer Alison Warner. His sister, Susy Kane, is also an actor and writer.

Kane studied English literature at Clare College, Cambridge, graduating in 1997.

Selected works

Television

Theatre

Radio / voice
 2004: The Xtra Factor (voice-overs)
 2010: Six Impossible Things
 2012: Occupied
 2011–2021: John Finnemore's Souvenir Programme
 2015: John Finnemore's Double Acts: "The Goliath Window"
 2015: North by Northamptonshire: Full Stop
 2017–2018: Time Spanner – Pilot and "The Dan in the High Castle"
 2017: The Now Show: "Now The Twelfth Night Show" (as Simon Dylan-Kane)
 2018: Angstrom
 2018: Agendum
 2019: The Monster Hunters (podcast)
 2019: Peter Pan (Audible)

Writer
 2005–2009: That Mitchell and Webb Sound
 2009–2010: That Mitchell and Webb Look
 2009: Laurence and Gus: Hearts and Minds
 2011: Jonah Non Grata
 2013: Before They Were Famous
 2017–2018: Time Spanner – Pilot and "The Dan in the High Castle"

Awards

External links
Simon Kane's blog

References 

British male actors
British comedy writers
Living people
Year of birth missing (living people)
Place of birth missing (living people)
British male voice actors